Pritchard's snake-necked turtle (Chelodina pritchardi) is a species of turtles in the family Chelidae. The species is endemic to a restricted area of Central Province, Papua New Guinea.

Etymology
Both the specific name, pritchardi, and the common name, Pritchard's snake-necked turtle, are in honour of British herpetologist Peter Pritchard.

References

External links

Asian Turtle Trade Working Group (2000).  "Chelodina pritchardi (errata version published in 2016)".   The IUCN Red List of Threatened Species 2000.   Downloaded on 29 July 2007.

Chelodina
Reptiles of Papua New Guinea
Reptiles described in 1994
Taxonomy articles created by Polbot
Endemic fauna of Papua New Guinea
Turtles of New Guinea